Ali Hajji or Ali Haji may refer to:
 Ali Hajji, West Azerbaijan
 Ali Haji (actor)

See also
 Ali Haji Warsame